Erica Cipressa (born 18 May 1996) is an Italian right-handed foil fencer and 2021 team Olympic bronze medalist.

She won two gold medals at the 2019 Summer Universiade.

Biography
She is the daughter of the former Olympic champion Andrea Cipressa.

Medal Record

Olympic Games

World Cup

See also
 Italy at the 2019 Summer Universiade

References

External links
 
 Erica Cipressa ai CONI

1996 births
Living people
Italian female fencers
Universiade medalists in fencing
Universiade gold medalists for Italy
Competitors at the 2018 Mediterranean Games
Fencers of Fiamme Oro
Medalists at the 2019 Summer Universiade
People from Mirano
Sportspeople from the Metropolitan City of Venice
Mediterranean Games competitors for Italy
Fencers at the 2020 Summer Olympics
Olympic fencers of Italy
Medalists at the 2020 Summer Olympics
Olympic bronze medalists for Italy
Olympic medalists in fencing
Competitors at the 2022 Mediterranean Games